"Thumbs" is a song recorded by American singer Sabrina Carpenter from her second studio album Evolution (2016), included as the third track of the album. The track was written by Priscilla Renea and its producer Steve Mac. The song was originally released by Hollywood Records as the third promotional single from Evolution on October 7, 2016, a week before the album's release. It was later released as the album's second single on January 3, 2017. "Thumbs" is an up-tempo electropop song with house and pop elements. Lyrically, the song talks about embracing individuality and rising above mediocrity.

It was accompanied by a music video directed by Hayley Young premiered on her Vevo channel on February 10, 2017. Carpenter promoted "Thumbs" with several live performances, including on Radio Disney Music Awards 2017, on Today and on The Late Late Show. It was the first song by Carpenter with a chart impact and it peaked at number one on Billboards Bubbling Under Hot 100 Singles. It was certified Platinum by United States (RIAA) and Norway (IFPI).

Background and recording
It was released initially as a promotional single and later released as a single. The song was written by Steve Mac and Priscilla Renea and was the only song in the album without Carpenter's writing credit. The song was the last recorded for the album, Carpenter says. "We'd finish the album, I then heard "Thumbs" which gave me these vibes of fame and black and gold and just like some of my favorite soulful songs." The song talks about embracing individuality and escaping mediocrity. She says that if people are falling into the same mistakes they are going to continue 'twiddling them thumbs', thus continuing to live in the mediocrity. Carpenter describes the other songs on the album as "children" of "Thumbs".

Composition and lyrical interpretation
Musically, "Thumbs" is a three minutes and thirty-six seconds electropop song with pop and house elements. In terms of music notation, "Thumbs" was composed using  common time in the key of C minor, with a moderately fast tempo of 135 beats per minute. The song follows the chord progression of Cm-Csus-C5-Csus-Cm–A-Fm/A-A-Fm/A-A-Fsus7-F7-Bsus-B. Carpenter's vocal range spans from the low note F3 to the high note of G5, giving the song two octave and one note of range. The tempo has a Swing feel.

Lyrically, the song talks about embracing individuality and rising above mediocrity. The chorus' lyric "They gonna keep on twiddling them thumbs" is a metaphor for wasting time doing pointless things and making no real progress.

Music video 
The music video, which was directed by Hayley Young, was uploaded to her Vevo account on YouTube on February 10, 2017. The video is set in a New York City Subway car and is shot in one take. The video features Carpenter singing the song with several bored people inside the subway on a typical big-city daily commute. When the idea of the video was being processed, Carpenter thought of a subway because it's where different people would be found; the line "Somewhere in the world" represents those people.

Critical reception
Brittany Goldfield Rodrigues of Andpop said "the jazzy vibe of this song sold us, and the scatting just made us play it on repeat. With this tune Sabrina really makes us fall for her unique jazz vibes she sprinkles into her pop sound."

Live performances
Carpenter first performed the song on the Honda Stage at the iHeartRadio Theater in Los Angeles on August 25, 2016, along with other new music before the release of Evolution. She performed the song on Today on November 22, 2016. On April 17, 2017, she made her late night talk show debut by performing the song on The Late Late Show with James Corden. On April 29, 2017, she performed the song at the 2017 Radio Disney Music Awards.

Track listing

Credits and personnel 
Recording and management
 Recorded at Rokstone Studios (London, United Kingdom)
 Lead vocals recorded in North Hollywood, California
 Mastered at Sterling Sound (New York City)
 BMG Gold Songs/Rokstone Music (ASCAP), All Rights Administered by BMG Rights Management (US), LLC, WB Music Corp. (ASCAP)

Personnel

 Sabrina Carpenter – lead vocals
 Steve Mac – songwriting, production
 Priscilla Renea – songwriting, background vocals
 Chris Laws – engineering
 Dan Pursey – engineering
 Mitch Allan – lead vocals recording
 Phil Tan – mixing
 Chris Gehringer – mastering

Credits adapted from Evolution liner notes.

Charts

Certifications

Release history

References

2016 songs
2017 singles
Sabrina Carpenter songs
Song recordings produced by Steve Mac
Songs written by Muni Long
Songs written by Steve Mac
Hollywood Records singles